Arenibacter palladensis is a heterotrophic and aerobic bacterium from the genus Arenibacter which has been isolated from the green alga Ulva fenestrata in the Sea of Japan.

References

Further reading

External links
Type strain of Arenibacter palladensis at BacDive -  the Bacterial Diversity Metadatabase	

Flavobacteria
Bacteria described in 2006